Renzo Gracie (born March 11, 1967) is a Brazilian mixed martial artist and 7th degree coral belt Brazilian Jiu-Jitsu practitioner and coach. A 3rd generation member of the Gracie Family of Brazilian jiu-jitsu, he is the grandson of Gracie jiu-jitsu founder Carlos Gracie, grandnephew of Helio Gracie, nephew of Carlos Gracie, Jr. and the son of 9th degree red belt Robson Gracie. 

By the age of 20, Gracie was a multiple-time BJJ champion in Brasil. In mixed martial arts, Renzo has competed in the Ultimate Fighting Championship, Pride Fighting Championships, K-1, RINGS, and International Fight League (head-coaching the New York Pitbulls). He holds notable victories over five former UFC Champions: Frank Shamrock (UFC Light Heavyweight Champion), Carlos Newton (UFC Welterweight Champion), Pat Miletich (UFC Welterweight Champion), Maurice Smith (UFC Heavyweight Champion), and Oleg Taktarov (UFC 6 Tournament Winner)

A world-famous Jiu-Jitsu coach, Gracie has produced several renowned black belts and is crediting with training some of the best fighters in North America such as: Georges St-Pierre, Frankie Edgar, Chris Weidman, Matt Serra, Ricardo Almeida, Roy Nelson, Rodrigo Gracie and Paul Creighton. Gracie is also known to have trained Sheikh Mohammed bin Zayed Al Nahyan, President of United Arab Emirates. 

Renzo Gracie: Legacy, a 2008 documentary film follows his influence on Brazilian Jiu-Jitsu and Mixed martial arts over a ten-year period, showing the origins of the sport from its bare knuckle days to the explosion of the sport in both Japan and America. In honor of his achievements and contributions to the sport, Gracie was inducted into the ADCC Hall of Fame on February 21, 2022. On January 18, 2023, Gracie was presented with his Coral Belt in Abu Dhabi by Rickson Gracie.

Mixed martial arts career 
Renzo debuted in the Brazilian vale tudo circuit. He had his first match against kickboxer Luiz Augusto Alvareda, whom he dominated with his grappling ability and submitted by rear naked choke. After the match, he moved to the United States to teach Brazilian jiu-jitsu.

World Combat Championships 
In October 1995, Gracie was called to fight in World Combat Championships, a no holds barred event created by Jon Peters's son Christopher. The event hosted two separate tournaments for strikers and grapplers whose winners would meet at the finals, and Gracie was put on the latter due to his Brazilian jiu-jitsu background. His first match was against Dutch judoka Ben Spijkers, who had taunted Gracie in the press conference and pranked him on his hotel room the previous night. Spijkers scored the first takedown, but Renzo answered with another, took his back through headbutts and elbow strikes and finally choked him for the win. After the bout, Gracie intentionally stepped on Spijkers's head as he walked away as an act of revenge for the pranking, an act he later apologized for. Gracie next fought striker Phil Benedict, and although he received a hard right punch in the first seconds, he executed a takedown and defeated Benedict by ground and pound from the mount. At the finals, Gracie then faced kickboxer James Warring, winning by neck crank in similar time.

Gracie had originally entered WCC with the idea of fighting Bart Vale, who would compete as well, as Vale had boasted that smaller opponents like Renzo were afraid of facing him. However, Vale would forfeit his place in the tournament after his first match, so the bout didn't happen. Producer Peters had the intention to host a second event where Gracie and Vale would fight in a "superfight" format, but these plans were abandoned.

Pentagon Combat 
On September 22, 1997, Gracie partook in Pentagon Combat, an MMA event founded by future ADCC backer Sheikh Tahnoon bin Zayed. Gracie was pitted against Eugenio Tadeu, a fighter whose style, luta livre, was in a huge rivalry with Brazilian jiu-jitsu at the time, which guaranteed the match was received with heat. Promoters of the event hired little security for the match, and although the luta livre supporters got fewer tickets than their jiu-jitsu homologues, they snuck into the arena earlier in the event. The first minutes of the match were uneventful, with Gracie claiming years later that Tadeu had greased up his body to difficult his grip, but he eventually managed to mount Tadeu. However, Gracie got tired, and Tadeu started to take control of the action.

When the fight became stalled against the cage wall, audience members pushed their way through security staff and grabbed the very cage, screaming insults at the fighters and even attacking them through the netting whenever they came near. Some spectators climbed up the fence while others pulled them down, leading the match to be briefly stopped to clear them out, while Gracie received both punches and kicks by luta livre supporters without the referee noticing. The situation finally exploded when Gracie fought back one of his attackers, causing a massive brawl to erupt among the over 400 spectators. Audience members threw chairs and seats to each other, the lights were turned off, and gunshots were heard. The event caused mixed martial arts to be banned in Rio de Janeiro for ten years.

Pride Fighting Championships 
Gracie debuted in the first event of Pride Fighting Championships, Pride 1, where he was pitted against Japanese judo-based fighter Akira Shoji. The Brazilian dominated the match, at several points threatening Shoji with armbars, rear naked chokes and omoplatas, all while receiving only superficial damage from kicks and knees, but he failed at finishing Shoji, and thus the match went to a draw after thirty minutes.

His first victory in Pride was at the very next event, Pride 2, against judoka and catch wrestler Sanae Kikuta. The match was fought under special rules by Gracie's demand, which included an unlimited number of ten-minute rounds. However, this had the effect to lengthen the match to almost an hour, as both fighters remained largely inactive in the clinch and Renzo's guard. Only in the sixth round, Renzo managed to lock a guillotine choke and submit Kikuta. In 2014, Gracie claimed to have been drugged by PRIDE promoters before the fight to explain his performance.

Gracie returned in Pride 8, where he fought professional wrestler Alexander Otsuka. The latter, who came to the match bandaged due to a pro wrestling match the same day, scored a takedown and passed Gracie's guard for a moment, but the Brazilian regained his defense. Gracie came back with hard upkicks and multiple submission attempts, like a triangle choke and a guillotine choke, being answered with short hammerfists by the Japanese. After the match was restarted, Renzo seemed to secure an armbar from the bottom, only for Otsuka to escape and defend until the end. Even although Gracie next landed a German suplex-like takedown, the match ended with both Otsuka and Gracie pursuing a submission each.

Fighting Network Rings
Gracie discontinued his appearances in PRIDE to participate in the King of Kings tournament of rival promotion Fighting Network Rings. His first bout in the card was against the promotion's usual low carder Wataru Sakata, who nonetheless had a 20Ibs advantage. Gracie defeated him quickly, taking him down from a kick and submitting him by armbar. After advancing round to meet former kickboxer and UFC Heavyweight Champion Maurice Smith, Gracie achieved the same result, taking him down before submitting him with a judo-style yoko-sankaku-jime/ude-gatame combination.

The Brazilian reached the quarterfinals, where he encountered another Rings shoot wrestler, Kiyoshi Tamura. Gracie started the fight with takedowns and guillotine choke attempts, but Tamura took over with defense and positional control, ending the first round inflicting ground and pound on Renzo. At the second, the wrestler started passing Gracie's guard and capturing his back, to the extent of locking a facedown crucifix and searching for a rear naked choke. Although Gracie managed to escape without being submitted, the unanimous decision was given to Tamura, thus eliminating the Brazilian.

Return to Pride
Gracie returned to Pride to fight Kazushi Sakuraba, who had been nicknamed "The Gracie Hunter" for his victories against Renzo's relatives Royler and Royce. During the first round, they fought evenly, mainly exchanging strikes and takedown attempts. At the second, the Japanese wrestler took Gracie down, but he was unable to pass his guard despite his many techniques and tricks. The match finally came to its peak when Renzo executed a De la Riva reversal and captured Sakuraba's back against the corner. At that moment, the Japanese got hold of Gracie's arm and spun around with a Kimura lock, dislocating his arm before hitting the mat and prompting the referee to stop the fight. Uncharacteristically for the Gracie side during their rivalry with Sakuraba, Renzo took the mic after the match and declared Sakuraba was the better man. Similarly, years later Gracie called Sakuraba "his hero" and remembered their match as "one of the biggest lessons he learned in his life".

Gracie next fought American wrestler Dan Henderson at Pride 13, now under new rules that allowed knees and kicks to the head of a downed opponent. The resultant match was short, as Henderson used his wrestling superiority to keep the fight on their feet and land punches and knees as per the new ruleset. After one minute, Gracie tried a takedown, but Henderson landed two heavy punches and knocked him out. The American became the first fighter ever to knock out a Gracie. Renzo bounced back with a victory over professional wrestler Michiyoshi Ohara, who resorted to clinch defensively for most of the match.

In 2002, Gracie fought against Shungo Oyama in Pride 21. Oyama taunted Renzo incessantly through the match and imitated Sakuraba's offensive moves, getting some measure of success with it. Renzo became so irritated that he spat on Oyama at the end of the second round. At the third, Gracie looked to re-take the bout, but they just could exchange takedowns and strikes before the match went to the judges, with Oyama winning a unanimous decision. Gracie was unhappy with this, and stated to believe he had lost the decision only because he spat on Oyama.

His last match for Pride would be in October 2003 against eclectic grappler Carlos Newton. Gracie took him down and captured his back, only for Newton to reverse positions. The two fighters exchanged multiple sweeps and submission attempts in a short time, with Renzo almost locking a kneebar, but Newton ultimately escaped and ended the round hitting ground and pound from side mount. At the second, Renzo received a slamming takedown and a hip throw, so he opted to grab a guillotine choke and pull guard, seeking the finish, yet Newton freed himself and ended the match again with punches from half guard. Newton was given the split decision win, which Gracie disputed.

IFL and EliteXC 
Gracie debuted for International Fight League in September 2006, submitting Pat Miletich in three minutes with a guillotine choke. He would then rematch Carlos Newton in December. The match was noted to resemble oddly their first encounter, as they struggled for position in the first round with Gracie threatening a submission and Newton ending it in side mount. The situation reversed at the second, as Gracie flipped Newton over to side mount, only for Newton to menace him with an ankle lock. At the third and final round, Newton worked to keep the fight standing and made Gracie bleed with some glaring strikes, but the fight ended without a result, and after deliberation, the judges gave it to Gracie. This outcome was immediately met with controversy, with Gracie himself declaring he felt Newton was the winner.

On February 10, 2007 Gracie won a match by disqualification against former UFC Light Heavyweight Champion Frank Shamrock for upstart MMA promotion EliteXC on its debut night Saturday February 10, 2007, on Showtime. Gracie was able to take Frank down and keep the fight on the ground, until Shamrock was disqualified by referee Herb Dean for landing illegal knee strikes to the back of Gracie's head. Shamrock had already been given one warning earlier in the match for illegal strikes to the back of Gracie's head. After the match, Gracie had to be helped out of the ring and back to his dressing room by his team allegedly due to receiving a concussion from the strikes.

Ultimate Fighting Championship 
Returning from a three-year hiatus, Gracie signed a six-fight contract with the UFC in December 2009 and faced former UFC Welterweight Champion Matt Hughes on April 10, 2010, at UFC 112 in Abu Dhabi, United Arab Emirates. Although Gracie fared reasonably well against the American, he began to take more and more leg kicks, and by the end of the second round, the fight began to look more and more to Hughes's favor. The third round saw Hughes score with a series of uppercuts and hooks that hurt Gracie. Hughes finished Gracie with a series of punches. Gracie lost to Hughes by TKO at 4:40 of round 3, becoming the second Gracie to fall victim to Matt Hughes, the other was his famous cousin Royce Gracie at UFC 60.

ONE Championship 
On June 7, 2018, ONE Championship's president Chatri Sityodtong announced that Renzo Gracie had been enticed from retirement and was scheduled to face Yuki Kondo at One Championship Reign of Kings on July 27, marking Gracie's first fight since his loss to Matt Hughes in 2010. He won the fight via rear-naked choke submission in the second round.

Other ventures 
Renzo formerly coached a team, the New York Pitbulls, for the International Fight League.

Gracie is the head instructor at the Renzo Gracie Academy in midtown Manhattan. Many well-known BJJ and MMA fighters have been trained by Renzo, including BJJ black belts Rodrigo Gracie, former UFC Welterweight Champion Georges St-Pierre, former UFC Welterweight Champion Matt Serra, BJJ World Champion Rafael "Gordinho" Correa, Paul Creighton, Alan Teo, David Branch (fighter), Rafael Natal, former Middleweight King of Pancrase Ricardo Almeida, Sean Alvarez and former UFC Middleweight Champion Chris Weidman.

Renzo Gracie also has affiliate academies in the United States, Brazil, Peru, Singapore, Canada, Mexico, South Africa, Iraq, Israel, the Netherlands, and Belgium.

Gracie has co-written two instructional books on jiu-jitsu; "Brazilian Jiu-Jitsu: Theory and Technique" with his cousin Royler Gracie, and "Mastering Jujitsu" with training partner John Danaher. He has also been the personal jiu-jitsu teacher of Sheikh Mohammed bin Zayed Al Nahyan, Crown Prince of Abu Dhabi, since 1993.

Metamoris

On November 22, 2014, Renzo fought Kazushi Sakuraba in a grappling match in Metamoris V.  The fight ended in a draw.

Personal life 
Gracie is a resident of Holmdel Township, New Jersey. He and his wife Cristina have three children. He has eleven brothers and sisters, including Charles Gracie, Flavia Gracie (Kyra Gracie's mother), Carla Gracie (Neiman Gracie's mother), Ralph Gracie and the late Ryan Gracie.
In early 2022, Renzo released his biography, written by Brazilian former Special Culture Secretary and theatre director Roberto Alvim.

Ambassador of International Tourism 
A supporter President Bolsonaro of Brazil, Gracie became in August 2019 Ambassador of International Tourism for Embratur, a branch of the Brazilian Ministry of Tourism. In September 2019, in his new ambassador role, and after President Macron of France called the wildfires an “international crisis,” Gracie threatened in a video to choke the French President, calling him a clown and insulting his wife. Gracie declared the Amazon rainforest wildfires to be “false fires”.

Public image 
In May 2014, Gracie was arrested at 1OAK in New York City after being charged with gang assault after sending a night club bouncer to the hospital. Gracie maintained that he took down the bouncer and mounted him, but did not punch him. Gracie's cousin, Igor was arrested together with 5 other people in the incident.

In 2017 Gracie took part in a BJJ seminar in Chechnya at a gym owned by dictator Ramzan Kadyrov, Gracie appeared during that time on local TV to promote Kadyrov’s government. In September 2022, footage emerged of Gracie being involved in an altercation with a stranger in the subway, Gracie alleged that the man had approached him making racist remarks. According to MMA website bloodyelbow, Gracie’s social media is filled with fascist apologia, homophobia, misogyny and xenophobic videos.

Instructor lineage 
Mitsuyo Maeda → Carlos Gracie, Sr. → Helio Gracie → Rolls Gracie → Carlos Gracie, Jr. → Renzo Gracie

Championships and accomplishments

Submission grappling
ADCC Submission Fighting World champion (1998 and 2000)

Brazilian jiu-jitsu
Copa Atlântico Sul Champion (1988, 1989, 1990, 1991, 1994)

Mixed martial arts
World Combat Championships
World Combat Championships 1 Tournament Winner

Mixed martial arts record 

|-
| Win
| align=center| 14–7–1 (1)
| Yuki Kondo
| Submission (rear-naked choke)
| ONE Championship: Reign of Kings
| 
| align=center| 2
| align=center| 1:40
| Manila, Philippines
| 
|-
| Loss
| align=center| 13–7–1 (1)
| Matt Hughes
| TKO (punches)
| UFC 112
| 
| align=center| 3
| align=center| 4:40
| Abu Dhabi, United Arab Emirates
| 
|-
| Win
| align=center| 13–6–1 (1)
| Frank Shamrock
| DQ (knees to downed opponent)
| EliteXC: Destiny
| 
| align=center| 2
| align=center| 2:00
| Southaven, Mississippi, United States
| 
|-
| Win
| align=center|  (1)
| Carlos Newton
| Decision (split)
| IFL: World Team Championships
| 
| align=center| 3
| align=center| 4:00
| Uncasville, Connecticut, United States
| 
|-
| Win
| align=center| 11–6–1 (1)
| Pat Miletich
| Submission (guillotine choke)
| IFL: Gracie vs. Miletich
| 
| align=center| 1
| align=center| 3:37
| Moline, Illinois, United States
| 
|-
| Loss
| align=center| 10–6–1 (1)
| B.J. Penn
| Decision (unanimous)
| K-1 World Grand Prix 2005 in Hawaii
| 
| align=center| 3
| align=center| 5:00
| Honolulu, Hawaii, United States
| 
|-
| Loss
| align=center| 10–5–1 (1)
| Carlos Newton
| Decision (split)
| Pride Bushido 1
| 
| align=center| 2
| align=center| 5:00
| Saitama, Japan
| 
|-
| Loss
| align=center| 10–4–1 (1)
| Shungo Oyama
| Decision (unanimous)
| Pride 21
| 
| align=center| 3
| align=center| 5:00
| Saitama, Japan
| 
|-
| Win
| align=center| 10–3–1 (1)
| Michiyoshi Ohara
| Decision (unanimous)
| Pride 17
| 
| align=center| 3
| align=center| 5:00
| Tokyo, Japan
| 
|-
| Loss
| align=center| 9–3–1 (1)
| Dan Henderson
| KO (punch)
| Pride 13 - Collision Course
| 
| align=center| 1
| align=center| 1:40
| Saitama, Japan
| 
|-
| Loss
| align=center| 9–2–1 (1)
| Kazushi Sakuraba
| Technical Submission (kimura)
| Pride 10 - Return of the Warriors
| 
| align=center| 2
| align=center| 9:43
| Saitama, Japan
| 
|-
| Loss
| align=center| 9–1–1 (1)
| Kiyoshi Tamura
| Decision (unanimous)
| Rings: King of Kings 1999 Final
| 
| align=center| 2
| align=center| 5:00
| Tokyo, Japan
| 
|-
| Win
| align=center| 9–0–1 (1)
| Maurice Smith
| Submission (straight armbar)
|rowspan=2|Rings: King of Kings 1999 Block B
|rowspan=2|
| align=center| 1
| align=center| 0:50
|rowspan=2|Osaka, Japan
| 
|-
| Win
| align=center| 8–0–1 (1)
| Wataru Sakata
| Submission (armbar)
| align=center| 1
| align=center| 1:25
| 
|-
| Win
| align=center| 7–0–1 (1)
| Alexander Otsuka
| Decision (unanimous)
| Pride 8
| 
| align=center| 2
| align=center| 10:00
| Tokyo, Japan
| 
|-
| Win
| align=center| 6–0–1 (1)
| Sanae Kikuta
| Submission (guillotine choke)
| Pride 2
| 
| align=center| 6
| align=center| 0:43
| Yokohama, Japan
| 
|-
| Draw
| align=center| 5–0–1 (1)
| Akira Shoji
| Draw (time limit)
| Pride 1
| 
| align=center| 3
| align=center| 10:00
| Tokyo, Japan
| 
|-
| NC
| align=center| 5–0 (1)
| Eugenio Tadeu
| No contest (fans rioted)
| Pentagon Combat
| 
| align=center| 1
| align=center| 14:45
| Rio de Janeiro, Brazil
| 
|-
| Win
| align=center| 5–0
| Oleg Taktarov
| KO (upkick)
| Martial Arts Reality Superfighting
| 
| align=center| 1
| align=center| 1:02
| Birmingham, Alabama, United States
| 
|-
| Win
| align=center| 4–0
| James Warring
| Submission (choke)
|rowspan=3|WCC 1: First Strike
|rowspan=3|
| align=center| 1
| align=center| 2:47
|rowspan=3|Charlotte, North Carolina, United States
| 
|-
| Win
| align=center| 3–0
| Phil Benedict
| TKO (submission to strikes)
| align=center| 1
| align=center| 2:08
| 
|-
| Win
| align=center| 2–0
| Ben Spijkers
| Submission (choke)
| align=center| 1
| align=center| 2:38
| 
|-
| Win
| align=center| 1–0
| Luiz Augusto Alvareda
| Submission (rear-naked choke)
| Desafio: Gracie Vale Tudo
| 
| align=center| 1
| align=center| 7:03
| Rio de Janeiro, Brazil
|

Grappling record
{| class="wikitable sortable" style="font-size:80%; text-align:left;"
|-
| colspan=8 style="text-align:center;" | 19 Matches, 11 Wins (3 Submissions), 7 Losses, 1 Draw
|-
!  Result
!  Rec.
!  Opponent
!  Method
!  text-center|  Event
!  Division
!  Date
!  Location
|-
|Draw||11-7-1|| Kazushi Sakuraba || Draw || Metamoris V||Superfight|| November 22, 2014 || Los Angeles, CA
|-
|Loss||11-7|| Mario Sperry || Points || ADCC 2011||Superfight|| September 25, 2011 || Nottingham
|-
|Loss||11-6|| Mike Fowler || Points || ADCC 2007 || –77 kg|| May 4, 2007 || Trenton, NJ
|-
|Loss||11-5|| Pablo Popovitch || Points || ADCC 2005 ||–77 kg|| 2005||  Long Beach, CA
|-
|Loss||11-4|| Marcelo García || Points ||rowspan=2| ADCC 2003 ||rowspan=2|–77 kg|| rowspan=2|May 17, 2003||rowspan=2|  São Paulo
|-
|Win||11-3|| George Sotiropoulos || Points 
|-
|Loss||10-3|| Chris Brown || Advantage || ADCC 2001 ||–88 kg|| 2001 || Abu Dhabi
|-
|Win||10-2|| Jean Jacques Machado || Advantage || rowspan=4|ADCC 2000 || rowspan=4|–77 kg|| rowspan=4|2000||rowspan=4|  Abu Dhabi
|-
|Win||9-2|| Marcio Feitosa || Submission (guillotine choke)
|-
|Win||8-2|| Israel Albuquerque || Points
|-
|Win||7-2|| Dennis Hallman || Points 
|-
|Loss||6-2|| Egan Inoue || Points || rowspan=2| ADCC 1999 ||rowspan=2|–99 kg|| rowspan=2|1999||rowspan=2|  Abu Dhabi
|-
|Win||6-1|| Fan Yi || Submission (verbal) 
|-
|Win||5-1|| Luis Brito || Submission (guillotine choke) ||rowspan=4| ADCC 1998 ||rowspan=4|–77 kg|| rowspan=4|1998||rowspan=4|  Abu Dhabi
|-
|Win||4-1|| Fabiano Iha || Points 
|-
|Win||3-1|| Rodrigo Medeiros || Points 
|-
|Win||2-1|| Frank Trigg || Decision 
|-
|Loss||1-1|| Wallid Ismail || decision || Desafio WxR|| Superfight||1993||  Rio de Janeiro
|-
|Win||1-0|| Ricardo de la Riva || Advantage || Campeonato Brasileiro||Superfight|| 1993||  Rio de Janeiro
|-

Documentary 
On November 14, 2008, there was a limited release on DVD of a documentary, titled "Renzo Gracie: Legacy", which followed Gracie over 10 years of his life. Its tagline is "A 10-year history of mixed martial arts through the eyes of Renzo Gracie, one of its most charismatic pioneers."

See also
 List of ONE Championship alumni

Notes

References

External links 

 
 Interview: Renzo Gracie and the Art of Brazilian Jiu-jitsu
 The official website of the documentary
 
 

Brazilian male mixed martial artists
Welterweight mixed martial artists
Mixed martial artists utilizing Brazilian jiu-jitsu
Mixed martial artists utilizing judo
Brazilian male judoka
Brazilian people of Scottish descent
Mixed martial arts trainers
Brazilian jiu-jitsu trainers
1967 births
Living people
People from Holmdel Township, New Jersey
Brazilian emigrants to the United States
Renzo
People awarded a black belt in Brazilian jiu-jitsu
Sportspeople from Rio de Janeiro (city)
Ultimate Fighting Championship male fighters
ADCC Hall of Fame inductees
Brazilian jiu-jitsu practitioners who have competed in MMA (men)
People awarded a coral belt in Brazilian jiu-jitsu